This is a complete episode listing of the anime television series  and its sequel , created by Gonzo. The Aegis of Uruk premiered on Japanese television, and across various websites including YouTube on April 1, 2008. The Sword of Uruk followed on Japanese television and, again, across various websites on January 8, 2009.

Aegis of Uruk
The first season of The Tower of Druaga began airing on April 1, 2008, and concluded on June 20. It consists of twelve episodes and follows the journey of Jil, Kaaya, Neeba, and other adventurers climbing the mysterious Tower of Druaga. The opening theme, Swinging is performed by Muramasa☆ and the ending theme,  is performed by Kenn, the voice of Jil.

Sword of Uruk
The second season of The Tower of Druaga premiered on January 8, 2009 and ran for twelve episodes. Six months after the events of the first season, Jil, Fatina, and the surviving Climbers have settled in Meskia after the defeat of Druaga and the betrayals of Kaaya and Neeba. However, when a mysterious young girl appears, Jil and his companions must climb the Tower once more. The opening theme for the second season is "Questions?" by Yu Nakamura and the ending theme for episodes 01(13) to 11(23),  is performed by Fumiko Orikasa, the voice of Kaaya. The ending theme for 12(24) is "Swinging" by Muramasa☆.

References

Tower of Druaga